

Skis

The following is a list of businesses known for manufacturing skis. Some of these manufacturers may also produce boots and bindings.

Boots
The following list consists of companies known primarily for their ski boots. Some entries are duplicated from above, but not all. Some brands, like Head, sell branded boots from other companies and are therefore not listed here.

References

 
ski brands